

Plesiosaurs

Newly named plesiosaurs
Refer to article on these carnivorous aquatic reptiles. 

Plesiosaurs (sensu Plesiosauroidea) appeared at the start of the Jurassic Period, and thrived until the Cretaceous–Paleogene extinction event, at the end of the Cretaceous Period. While they were Mesozoic diapsid reptiles that lived at the same time as dinosaurs, they were not dinosaurs.

Pterosaurs

New taxa

See also

 Plesiosaur

References

1810s in paleontology
Paleontology